Altenstadt is a municipality in the district of Neu-Ulm in Bavaria in Germany.

The municipality is located in middle Swabia in the valley of the Iller, about 30 km south of Ulm and 25 km north of Memmingen.

Districts

Altenstadt is arranged into 7 districts. The districts are:
 Altenstadt
 Bergenstetten
 Dattenhausen
 Filzingen
 Herrenstetten
 Illereichen
 Untereichen

Sights

See also 
 Synagogues of the Swabian type (Altenstadt)

References

External links

 
 
 

Neu-Ulm (district)